The CZW Wired Championship was a professional wrestling world television championship in the Combat Zone Wrestling (CZW) promotion.

History 
Throughout the championship's history, there were 28 reigns between 20 champions. The inaugural champion was Tyler Veritas. The oldest champion was Blackwater, winning the title at 33 years old, while the youngest champion was Jordan Oliver when he won it at 19. A. R. Fox, Joe Gacy and Joey Janela were tied for the most reigns at three. A. R. Fox's sole reign was the longest reign at 455 days, while Ace Austin' reign was the shortest at less than a day.

Inaugural tournament (2009)

Reigns

Combined reigns

References

External links
 CZW Wired Title History at Cagematch.net

Wired
Television wrestling championships
World professional wrestling championships
Hardcore wrestling championships
2009 establishments in the United States